Alwin is a German and Dutch form of Alvin and may refer to:

Alwin-Broder Albrecht (1903–1945), German naval officer, one of Adolf Hitler's adjutants during World War II
Alwin Berger (1871–1931), German botanist and contributor to the nomenclature of succulent plants
Alwin Boerst (1910–1944), German World War II Luftwaffe Stuka ace
 Alwin Elling (1897-1973), German filmmaker
Alwin C. Ernst (1881–1948), American businessman, co-founder of the accounting firm of Ernst & Ernst
Alwin de Prins (born 1978), former competitive swimmer who represented Luxembourg
Alwin Hammers (born 1942), German theologian
Alwin Karl Haagner (1880–1962), South African ornithologist
Alwin Al Jarreau (1940–2017), American singer
Alwin Kloekhorst (born 1978), Dutch linguist, Indo-Europeanist and Hittitologist
Alwin Korselt (born 1864), German mathematician
Alwin McGregor (1889–1963), dual-code rugby footballer, represented New Zealand
Alwin Mittasch (1869–1953), German chemist
Alwin Nikolais (1910–1993), American choreographer
Edgar Alwin Payne (1883–1947), American Western landscape painter and muralist
Friedrich Carl Alwin Pockels (1865–1913), German physicist
Don Alwin Rajapaksa (1905–1967), Sri Lankan politician and member of parliament
Robert Alwin Schlumberger (1814–1879), entrepreneur, the first producer of sparkling wine in Austria
Alwin Schockemöhle (born 1937), former German show-jumper
Alwin Schultz (1838–1909), German art historian and medievalist, professor of art history at the Charles University in Prague
Alwin Wagner (born 1950), West German discus thrower
Alwin Wolz (1897–1978), highly decorated General major in the Luftwaffe during World War II

See also
Karl Alwin (1891–1945), German conductor who emigrated to Mexico
Alwin Arundel Lowdham, protagonist in J. R. R. Tolkien's abandoned novel The Notion Club Papers (1945)
Alwin der Letzte, 1960 East German film
Allwyn
Aylwin
Alvin
Halwin

Masculine given names
German masculine given names
Dutch masculine given names